Ambodilazana is a rural commune in the district of Toamasina II (district), in the region of Atsinanana, on the east coast of Madagascar.

References

Populated places in Atsinanana